The following lists events that happened during 1987 in Armenia.

Incumbents
Prime Minister: Fadey Sargsyan

Events

October
 October 18 - A minor rally on Freedom Square, Yerevan for the unification of Artsakh with Armenia.

References

 
1980s in Armenia
Years of the 20th century in Armenia
Armenia
Armenia
Armenia
Armenia